This is an episode list for Clutch, an online thriller about small-time criminals striking back at organized crime, with each webisode 6–14 minutes long. The first episode was posted June 14, 2011. It is broadcast on Clutch's official website, on Koldcast TV, Blip, JTS and other sites.  The show follows the exploits of pickpocket Kylie and her accomplices as they take on Marcel Obertovitch, the local crime lord.

Clutch was created by Jonathan Robbins, with most episodes directed by him, though occasional guest directors (Johnathan Stamp, Season 1, Episode 4, for example) are brought in as well.

, 19 episodes of Clutch have been released, comprising 2 seasons.

Episode list

Season 1 (2011)

Season 2 (2012–2013)

Lists of web series episodes